Firestarter may refer to:

Fire making
Fire making devices, including:
Firelighter, a consumer product for starting a fire
Fire striker, a piece of carbon steel from which sparks are struck by the sharp edge of flint, chert or similar rock
Magnesium alloy fire starter, a device used by hikers
Slam rod fire starter aka fire piston
 Charcoal starting devices or substances:
 Chimney starter, a metal tube used with kindling
 Electric charcoal starter, using a heating element
 Charcoal lighter fluid, a flammable fluid
Arsonist, a criminal who deliberately sets fire to property
Pyromaniac, a mentally ill person who sets fires
Pyrokinetic, a person having the psychic ability to create and control fire

Books
Firestarter (novel), a 1980 novel by Stephen King

Film and television
Firestarter, a 1984 film based on the novel by Stephen King
Firestarter: Rekindled, a 2002 television miniseries sequel to the film
Firestarter, a 2022 film remake based on the novel by Stephen King
Firestarter – The Story of Bangarra, 2020 Australian documentary film
"Firestarter" (FLCL), an episode of FLCL
"Firestarter" (Third Watch), an episode of Third Watch

Music
"Firestarter" (The Prodigy song) (1996)
"Firestarter" (Samantha Jade song) (2013)
Firestarter (EP), an EP by Jimmy Eat World
Quest for Fire: Firestarter, Vol. 1, an album by Kardinal Offishall
"Firestarter", a song from Special Forces (38 Special album)
"Fire Starter", a song from Demi Lovato's album, "Demi"
"Firestarter", a song from Ran-d & E-life (2015)

Other
Firestarter (firewall), a tool to configure a firewall for Linux
Firestarter, a youth empowerment curriculum published by the Freechild Project
FireStarter (video game), a video game by GSC Game World

See also
Start a Fire (disambiguation)
Start the Fire (disambiguation)